"Until You Loved Me" is a song by Canadian pop rock band The Moffatts. It was released in April 1999 as the fourth single from their third album, Chapter I: A New Beginning. The song was a hit in Canada, reaching No. 23 on Canada's singles chart and peaked at No. 57 on the Canadian RPM Adult Contemporary chart. The song was the carrier single of the soundtrack of the motion picture Never Been Kissed and was the band's US debut.

Critical reception
David Veitch of the Calgary Sun described Until You Loved Me as having a distinct Barenaked Ladies vibe.

Music video
The music video premiered in mid-1999 and featured Boy Meets World/Girl Meets World actress Danielle Fishel and clips from the film Never Been Kissed.

Track listing 
 CD 1
 "Until You Loved Me" – 3:39
 "Snippets" (Misery, Written All Over My Heart, Miss You Like Crazy) - 4:07
 "Let's Party" - 3:17

 CD 2
 "Until You Loved Me" – 3:39
 "She Said" - 3:47
 "All I Need Is You" - 4:37

Chart positions

References 

1999 singles
The Moffatts songs
EMI Records singles
Songs written by Phil Thornalley
1998 songs